Blue Canyon may refer to:

Locations 
Blue Canyon, California
Blue Canyon–Nyack Airport
Blue Canyon, Washington
Blue Canyon Wind Farm, Oklahoma
The northwest drainage of Black Mesa, in northeast Arizona
A lava field near Fort Defiance, Arizona

Companies 
Blue Canyon Technologies, a satellite manufacturer bought by Raytheon Intelligence & Space in 2020

See also
 Canyon Blue (N536JB), the name of the aircraft involved in the JetBlue Airways Flight 292 incident on September 21, 2005.